Kim Ki-nam (born August 28, 1934) is a North Korean official.  He is a former Vice Chairman (previously Secretary) of the Workers' Party of Korea, and Director of the Propaganda and Agitation Department from 1989 until 2017, responsible for coordinating the country's press, media, fine arts, and publishing to support government policy. He was also a vice-chairman of the Committee for the Peaceful Reunification of the Fatherland, in which capacity he led numerous visits to the South, and has served several terms in the Supreme People's Assembly, to which he was first elected in November 1977.


Biography

Kim Ki-nam was born in Anda, Heilongjiang, China

A graduate from the Kim Il-sung University and Soviet party schools, at first he worked in foreign affairs (being North Korea's ambassador to Beijing in the early 1950s) before moving to the Propaganda and Agitation Department in the late 1960s. In 1974, he was appointed editor of the Party's theoretical magazine, Kulloja, and in 1976 he was promoted to editor-in-chief of Rodong Sinmun. He is credited with having produced articles and essays creating the cult of Kim Jong-il and praising Kim Il-sung's historic role. He was elected to the 6th Central Committee at the 6th Party Congress in October 1980, director of the Propaganda and Agitation Department in April 1989 and simultaneously secretary for propaganda and party history in 1992.

Kim Ki-nam was the party's propaganda boss and key author of the country's political slogans during Kim Jong-il's regime. He was given a role in ensuring Kim Jong-un's succession drive and appointed to the 6th Politburo in September 2010. He was one of the only two civilian officials who accompanied Kim Jong-il's coffin during his funeral in December 2011, the other being Choe Thae-bok. He was also given a seat in the State Affairs Commission in June 2016 when it was established. He was replaced in October 2017 by Pak Kwang-ho in all his functions at a Central Committee plenum.

In 2016, he was placed under sanctions by the United States government.

Works

See also

Politics of North Korea

References

External links

Members of the Supreme People's Assembly
People from Kumya County
People from Wonsan
1934 births
Living people
Members of the 6th Politburo of the Workers' Party of Korea
Members of the 6th Central Committee of the Workers' Party of Korea
Vice Chairmen of the Workers' Party of Korea and its predecessors